The Bugs Bunny/Road Runner Movie is a 1979 American animated comedy package film directed by Chuck Jones, consisting of a compilation of classic Looney Tunes/Merrie Melodies shorts and newly animated bridging sequences hosted by Bugs Bunny. The bridging sequences, which had been produced in 1978, show Bugs at his home, which is cantilevered over a carrot-juice waterfall (modeled on Frank Lloyd Wright's "Fallingwater" house in Bear Run, Pennsylvania). The film was released to celebrate the 40th anniversary of Bugs Bunny.

Early on, Bugs discusses the wild villains he had co-starred with in his cartoons, which is followed by a tongue-in-cheek sequence depicting the history of comedy and a scene in which Bugs discusses his "several fathers". The latter scene was written by Chuck Jones as a way to debunk fellow animation director Bob Clampett's claims throughout the 1970s that he alone created Bugs, and Clampett's name is notably missing from Bugs' list, as a result of the conflict between Jones and Clampett. The film Bugs Bunny: Superstar featured Bob Clampett, and is another compilation of cartoon shorts, probably the first to examine the history of Warner cartoons, which under-played Bugs' other 'several fathers' and is part of the mentioned conflict.

All of the shorts featured were directed by Chuck Jones.
 
The combination of classic animated footage along with new animation would become the template for the theatrically released Looney Tunes movies for this film up until Daffy Duck's Quackbusters in 1988.

The film was dedicated to the memory of Chuck Jones' first wife, Dorothy Webster, who died before the film got released.

Plot 
Bugs Bunny, while giving a tour of his luxurious mansion, talks about the history of the chase and how it led to the invention of comedy. After introducing his "several fathers" involved in Looney Tunes productions, he discusses some of his famous rivalries, battles, and chases, all of which serve as introductions to footage from the classic short subjects. The final segment of the film consists of an extended chase sequence between Wile E. Coyote and the Road Runner compiled from several shorts. At the end of Bugs' tour, they appear as constellations in a chase in the night sky.

The film features a new gag involving the "That's all, Folks!" endline, apparently the idea of Chuck Jones (himself credited in the opening credits as having a "slightly disarranged mind"). When it appears at the start, an annoyed Bugs pushes away the bullseye rings and places a "NOT" into it so that it says "That's NOT all, Folks!". Then before the end credits roll, as it starts to write out, Bugs blocks its path and forces the quote marks to erase itself saying to with a snide "Well?" and forces it to rewrite itself as "That's not quite all, Folks!". Finally, after the credits finish, the Warner Bros. shield zooms in. Bugs appears on top and says, "Eat your heart out, Burt Reynolds!" The shield zooms back out, and then the writing re-appears, pre-written, as "That's really all, Folks!" with the word "really" underscored, ending the film.

Voice cast 
 Mel Blanc – Bugs Bunny, Daffy Duck, Porky Pig, Marvin The Martian, Wile E. Coyote, Pepe Le Pew, Dr. I.Q High, Hassan
 Stan Freberg – Man (uncredited)
 Joan Gerber – Cavewoman (uncredited)
 Paul Julian – The Road Runner (archive sound)
 Arthur Q. Bryan – Elmer Fudd (archive sound)
 Nicolai Shutorev – Giovanni Jones (singing voice) (archive sound)
 Charlie Dog, The Instant Martians, Penelope Pussycat, and El Toro are seen but do not speak

Cartoons in order of appearance

Cartoons with Bugs Bunny and others 
 Rabbit Seasoning (a brief clip is used)
 Hare-Way to the Stars
 Duck Dodgers in the 24½th Century
 Robin Hood Daffy (shortened)
 Duck Amuck
 Bully for Bugs
 Ali Baba Bunny
 Rabbit Fire
 For Scent-imental Reasons (shortened)
 Long-Haired Hare (shortened)
 What's Opera, Doc?
 Operation: Rabbit (shortened)

Cartoons with Road Runner & Wile E. Coyote 
 Hip Hip-Hurry! (Intro chase scene with mock-Latin names, the audio shot of dizzy and thinking Wile E. Coyote and the boulder attempt)
 Zoom and Bored (The scene where Wile E. gets tricked off a cliff and uses a jackhammer)
 To Beep or Not to Beep (The lasso scene and the catapult scenes)
 Zip 'N Snort (Human bow and arrow scene and the giant cannon scene)
 Guided Muscle (Human bow and arrow scene and the slingshot scene)
 Stop! Look! And Hasten! (The road-wall scenes, ACME bird seed on bridge scene and the ACME leg muscle vitamins scene)
 Wild About Hurry (ACME giant rubber band scene)
 Going! Going! Gosh! (Slingshot scene and Wile E. Coyote disguising himself as a woman scene)
 Zipping Along (Human-cannonball scene and the wrecking ball scene)
 Whoa, Be-Gone! (Teeter-totter scene, the trampoline scene and the high wire structure and dons a wheel-head scene)
 Hot-Rod and Reel! (Trampoline scene)
 There They Go-Go-Go! (Rock avalanche scene)
 Scrambled Aches (Spring coil scene)
 Fast and Furry-ous (ACME super outfit scene)
 Gee Whiz-z-z-z-z-z-z (ACME Bat-Man's outfit scene)
 Hopalong Casualty (Earthquake pills scene)
 Beep Prepared (The ending scene where Wile E. uses an ACME little-giant do-it-yourself rocket sled)

Release 
The film was released between April-May 1979 in some test markets as The Great American Chase. The film was shown at the 17th New York Film Festival on September 29, 1979, at Alice Tully Hall. The film opened at the Guild 50th Theatre on September 30, 1979. It set an opening-day record at the theater with a gross of $6,280.

Television 
It aired on HBO, CBS, Disney Channel and Cartoon Network.

Home media 
Warner Home Video (known as WCI Home Video prior to 1980) released The Bugs Bunny/Road Runner Movie on VHS and Betamax cassettes for the first time in 1979 as one of the studio's 20 launch titles (catalog number WB-1003), re-released in 1981 as well as on CED that same year, and again on VHS and Betamax in 1983 in the correct running time whereas previous releases had presented it time-compressed. After its fourth home video release in 1986 (which reverted back to the time-compressed print until 1997), the film was re-released on VHS and LaserDisc on February 3, 1998 (as part of the Warner Bros. 75th Anniversary VHS promotion). The Bugs Bunny/Road Runner Movie was released along with Bugs Bunny's 3rd Movie: 1001 Rabbit Tales on the Looney Tunes Movie Collection two-disc DVD set in 2005. It is also available for purchase or rent in the Apple iTunes Store and has appeared on Netflix in various locations; both iTunes and Netflix have the movie available in remastered HD quality. It is additionally available for HD streaming or download on Google Play, Amazon Prime Video, Microsoft Store, Movies Anywhere, Vudu, and Xfinity. No official Blu-ray version of the movie exists.

References

External links 

 
 
 

1979 films
1979 comedy films
1979 animated films
1970s American animated films
1970s children's animated films
1970s English-language films
American children's animated fantasy films
American chase films
Animated anthology films
Looney Tunes films
Duck Dodgers
Bugs Bunny films
Charlie Dog films
Daffy Duck films
Elmer Fudd films
Marvin the Martian films
Penelope Pussycat films
Pepé Le Pew films
Porky Pig films
Wile E. Coyote and the Road Runner films
Films about animation
Avalanches in film
Films about cattle
Bullfighting films
Animated films about cavemen
Films set in country houses
Films set in deserts
Films set in forests
Films set in outer space
Films set in 1979
Films directed by Chuck Jones
Films directed by Maurice Noble
Films with screenplays by Michael Maltese
Films scored by Carl Stalling
Films scored by Dean Elliott
Films scored by Milt Franklyn
Films scored by William Lava
Warner Bros. animated films